Fisheries Research Services (FRS) was an Executive Agency of the Scottish Government. FRS was responsible for scientific and technical research into the marine and freshwater fisheries and aquaculture, and the protection of the aquatic environment in Scotland. For these purposes, the agency had two fishery laboratories, allowing specialisation in both marine and freshwater fisheries. The FRS also maintained two research vessels.

On 1 April 2009, Fisheries Research Services was merged with the Scottish Fisheries Protection Agency and the Scottish Government Marine Directorate to form Marine Scotland, part of the core Scottish Government.

Structure
The marine laboratory is based in Victoria Road, Aberdeen; and the freshwater laboratory is based in Pitlochry, Perth and Kinross. The Agency also maintained other temporary research sites throughout Scotland.

The Agency was directly funded by the Scottish Government, which made up around 60% of income. The other 40% was derived from research income for projects carried out in conjunction with other government bodies in Europe. The Agency also worked with private firms.

Notable Staff

Bennet Birnie Rae
Sir Fred Holliday

See also
Fishing in Scotland

References

External links
 FRS Homepage 

Defunct bodies of the Scottish government
Fisheries and aquaculture research institutes
Organisations based in Perth and Kinross
Research institutes in Scotland
Organisations based in Aberdeen
Fishing in Scotland
Government research
Oceanographic organizations